Mr. Fixit may refer to:
 Mr. Fixit (TV series), a 1955-1965 Canadian television series
 Mr. Fix-It, a 1918 silent film starring Douglas Fairbanks
 Mr. Fix It (2006 film), a comedy film starring David Boreanaz
 "Mr. Fix It", an episode of Yes, Dear
 Mr. Fixit, a character in Richard Scarry's Busytown
 Mr. Fixit, a robot in Cubix: Robots for Everyone

See also
 Joe Fixit, an alias of the Hulk in Marvel comics